The 2010–11 Arizona Wildcats men's basketball team represented the University of Arizona during the 2010–11 NCAA Division I men's basketball season. The Wildcats, led by second year head coach Sean Miller, played their home games at the McKale Center and are members of the Pacific-10 Conference. Miller was named the Pac-10 Conference 2011 John R. Wooden Coach of the Year. The Wildcats finished the regular season 25–6, 14–4 in Pac-10 play to win the twelfth Pac-10 regular season championship title for first time since 2005 and lost in the championship game of the 2011 Pacific-10 Conference men's basketball tournament to Washington. They received an at-large bid in the 2011 NCAA Division I men's basketball tournament, as the No. 5 seed in the West Regional, where they defeated Memphis in the second round, Texas in the third round, and Duke in the round of sixteen.

Recruits

Roster

Depth chart

Schedule

|-
!colspan=9 style=| Exhibition

|-
!colspan=9 style=| Non-conference regular season

|-
!colspan=9 style=|  Pac-10 regular season

|-
!colspan=9 style=| Pac-10 tournament

|-
!colspan=9 style=| NCAA tournament

Awards

Lamont Jones
 Pac-10 Player of the Week (January 31, 2011)
Derrick Williams
 Pac-10 Player of the Year
 Pac-10 First Team All-Conference
 Pac-10 Player of the Week (December 6, 2010; January 17, 2011; February 21, 2011)
 Consensus NCAA All-American Second Team (Associated Press, Sporting News, USBWA, NABC)
 USBWA District IX Player of the Year
 Wooden Award All-American
 Sports Illustrated First-team All-American
 Fox Sports Second-team All-American
Sean Miller 
 Pac-10 John R. Wooden Coach of the Year

References

Arizona Wildcats men's basketball seasons
Arizona Wildcats
Arizona
Arizona Wildcats
Arizona Wildcats